The table tennis competition at the 2018 Central American and Caribbean Games was held in Barranquilla, Colombia from 19 to 24 July at the Centro Eventos Puerta de Oro.

Medal summary

Men's events

Women's events

Mixed events

Medal table

References

External links
2018 Central American and Caribbean Games – Table tennis 

2018 Central American and Caribbean Games events
Central American and Caribbean Games
2018
Table tennis in Colombia